, also called , , and  is a type of poisonous magic found in Japanese folklore.  It is the Japanese derivative of the Chinese Gu magic.

It is said to have been widely used in ancient China. It is not clear for how long it has been used, but scholars of Chinese characters such as Shizuka Shirakawa , who advocates the importance of magic in ancient times, have found traces of poison in the oracle bone script of the Yin and Zhou dynasties .[2] The earliest record of worms is in the Geography of the Suishu reads: "On May 5th, 100 species of insects were collected, the larger ones were snakes, the smaller ones were lice , Place them inside, let them eat each other, and keep what is left of the last species.If it is a snake, it is a serpent, if it is a louse, it is a louse.Do this and kill a person.”

To create kodoku, sorcerers would mix several insects in a jar, and let them kill one another until only one survived.  The fluids of the insect that survived would be used to poison an individual with a curse that would control them, cause them misfortune, or kill them. The remaining insect could also be used as a sort of "luck charm" granting the one who performed the ritual great wealth. In return the owner is supposed to feed the bug. Neglecting to do so would enrage the insect, if the owner does not equivalently repay the insect by placing all his or her riches beside a road, plus interest in gold and silver, the insect would devour the home owner. Therefore, this ritual could also be used as a death curse by giving the riches to an ignorant individual. The term "kodoku" can also be applied to the spirit which is the incarnation of this particular magic (which usually appears in the shape of a worm or other animal).
The technique was used in the Nara Period.

In fiction
The technique plays an important role in the first part of the 1985 historical fantasy novel Teito Monogatari.  The protagonist Yasunori Katō is a master of kodoku magic and uses it to manipulate his victims.  The spirit is represented as an insectoid worm (腹中虫, fukuchu-mushi) which lives in the stomach of the victim.
The term "spiritual kodoku" is used in the anime Ghost Hunt for a curse technique in which spirits are trapped like insects are in traditional kodoku practice. A dominant spirit devours the weaker spirits until it has enough power to kill the target of the curse. The only way to stop the curse is to "feed" the spirit as compensation.
 In InuYasha the main antagonist Naraku creates a kodoku inside a mountain to gather and merge hundreds of yōkai to form a new body for himself.
 Kodoku Experiment is a science fiction manga from Yukinobu Hoshino where a kodoku is being created on a planet filled with ferocious monsters.
 Kodoku is used in the anime Fushigi Yûgi (Episode 18) as a drug to change the personality of one of the major protagonists, Tamahome.
 The Kagewani from the anime of the same name is a shadow creature that was created through kodoku using several different animals instead of insects.
 In Ōsama Game: Kigen, a manga prequel of Ōsama Game, the culprit behind a murderous game is subsequently revealed to be a virus, created  through kodoku by Natsuko Honda's ancestors.
 The idea of Kodoku is a central motif to the plot of the manga BIOHAZARD Heavenly Island, where it is used by the main antagonists to develop a new B.O.W.
 In the Web Novel Re:Monster, Kodoku is used by the main protagonist as a method to create a more powerful army, from pitching many different summoned creatures against each other inside a hole, and letting them "evolve" by themselves. 
 In Mob Psycho 100, one of the minor antagonists, Matsuo, uses Kodoku to merge evil spirits to create powerful "pets".
Hunter x Hunter succession arc is based on this ceremony
 The Ao No Haha manga is entirely based upon the Kodoku Magic, there it is used to make stronger medicine by using a different "pot".
 Kotoribako and Ryoumen Sukuna (elements of Japanese folklore and Kowabana, Japanese scary stories usually spread by rumors and forums) may have been created by using some variant of the Kodoku Magic.
 In the Manga series Yu-Gi-Oh, the Millennium Items are created by sacrificing a certain number of "evil" (poisonous) people, and are clearly defined as a curse, each of them putting a weight on strong-minded users. Also, the Millennium Puzzle can be deemed a sort of Kotoribako (a difficult puzzle box created as a curse containing the remains, here the soul, of an individual, a young one moreover).
 In the Manga series Dokumushi the main characters are forced to participate in a kodoku involving humans, the only person who could be freed would be the one who survived by murdering and committing cannibalism with the other participants.
 In the Manga and Anime series Blue Lock the titular Blue Lock is a prison-like facility where three hundred talented high school soccer players from all over Japan are forced to participate in a soccer kodoku, the overall winner who is explicitly called the "sole survivor" will earn the right to become the national team's striker and those who lose will be banned from joining the team forever.

The japanese visual kei Band Kiryu hás a music video named Kodoku which describes the practice of this courses poisoning.

See also
 Kōshin

References 

Japanese folk religion
Poisons
Magic (supernatural)
Insects in religion

es:Kodoku
ja:蠱毒